The Cathedral of St. John the Evangelist, also known simply as St. John's Cathedral, is a Catholic cathedral and parish church located in Boise, Idaho, United States. It is the seat of the Diocese of Boise. The church building was individually listed on the National Register of Historic Places in 1978. It was included as a contributing property of the St. John's Cathedral Block when the rest of the parish buildings on Block 90 were added to the National Register in 1982. That same year, the parish buildings were included as a contributing property in the Fort Street Historic District.

History

The first Catholic church in Boise was dedicated on Christmas Eve 1870, but was destroyed in a fire 18 days later. Another frame structure was built that would serve as the cathedral of the Vicariate Apostolic of Idaho, established March 5, 1883, and the Diocese of Boise after it was established on August 25, 1893. It was located on the northwest corner of Ninth and Bannock Streets. As the city grew, a larger cathedral was needed and Bishop Alphonse Glorieux purchased property bounded by Fort, Hays, Eighth, and Ninth Streets. He laid the cornerstone for the present cathedral in 1906. So as not to be a financial drain on the parish, the church building was built in stages. After the lower level was completed the parish worshiped there. The walls and roof were completed in 1912, and the cathedral was completed in 1921 during the episcopate of Bishop Daniel Gorman, who dedicated it on March 27, Easter Sunday.

The rectory behind the cathedral was completed in 1906 for $12,000 as the Bishop Glorieux house. The 2½-story Tudor Revival structure features large gabled dormers, exposed rafters under all of the lateral eaves, a stone foundation, brick veneer and stone quoins on the first floor, and half-timbering on the second floor.

The present school building, called St. Joseph's School, was completed in 1925. The two-story brick structure was built for $35,000. The gymnasium was added to the school building in 1948. It is a two-story concrete structure. The school's name memorializes St. Joseph's church in Idaho City, which was destroyed by fire in 1867. It was the first Catholic church in the area.

Architecture

St. John's Cathedral was designed by one of the first architectural firms to work in Boise, Tourtellotte & Hummel. Built in the Romanesque Revival style, the architects used the Cathedral of Mainz in western Germany and the Basilica of Saint-Sernin, Toulouse as their inspiration. The exterior is Boise Sandstone, quarried just above the city at Table Rock.

The building was designed to have two towers topped with spires flanking the main façade, but they remain incomplete. A rose window graces the front of the church and the center gable above the main entrance features a statue of St. John the Evangelist on its peak. Corbeling, a continuous band of small projecting arches, encircles the building at the roofline. A fléche rises above the crossing.

The stained glass windows in the nave depict scenes from the life of Christ. The large window in the north transept depicts the Adoration of the Magi, flanked by windows portraying St. Alphonsus Ligouri and St. Theresa of Avila. The south transept window depicts the Ascension and is flanked by windows portraying St. Patrick and St. Rita. The windows in the sanctuary depict St. Joseph on the north and the Blessed Virgin Mary on the south. In the apse are windows portraying the Sacred Heart of Jesus and the Immaculate Heart of Mary. They are flanked by windows portraying the Four Evangelists. Although some of the art glass was installed by the Intermountain Glass Company of Boise, the stained glass windows were designed and installed by the John J. Kinsella Company of Chicago in 1920, except the window portraying the Holy Spirit in the center of the apse, which was installed in 1979. St. Cecilia is depicted in the window above the pipe organ.

The 3-manual, 2900-pipe organ was installed by Tellers-Kent in 1921. At the time, composer Frederick Fleming Beale, professor of music at the College of Idaho, was organist and choir director.

Restoration and Remodel 

The interior of the church had a major cleaning in 1952 and In 1960, another remodeling plan took place and the parish decided to continue to work with the Hummel family, hiring Charles Hummel's grandson, who was named Charles after his grandfather. Charles Hummel Jr. also worked on the 1979 restoration, focusing on four main ideas. He wanted to restore all the stained glass windows that illustrate the stories of the saints, create more seating for the different groups of people who would come to the cathedral for ceremonies, celebrations, and worship, renew the canvas accents and designs in the interior, and bring in tasteful modern lighting fixtures which accented the classic renaissance look but accommodated to the needs of the citizens. To accomplish such ideas, Hummel had to make some radical changes to the cathedral's interior. He also made sure important architectural details were not changed during the remodel. These details include the decorative gargoyles that metaphorically hold the weight of the church on their backs as a punishment for their sins, and the windows he restored.

To celebrate the church's centennial, Rob Thornton took on the job of remodeling the downstairs chapel. Not wanting to tread on the shoes of Hummel's original artistry, Thornton worked with him on the project. He took the plaster off the walls to expose the stone beneath but kept a section of the wood paneling that Hummel added in 1979. Thornton also added a dome-shaped hole in the ceiling of the chapel. Thornton not only worked on the chapel in the lower level but on the reception hall as well. He took out the brown carpeting, exposed the stone on the walls, and created more space. The baptismal font was redesigned as a pool and the former font was repurposed as an ambry to hold the holy oils. A reservation altar for the tabernacle was created in the south transept. The canopy was from the former high altar.  St John's received an Orchid Award in 1981 from the Idaho Historic Preservation Council for outstanding work in restoration.

See also
List of Catholic cathedrals in the United States
List of cathedrals in the United States

References

External links

Cathedral Website
Diocese of Boise Website

Religious organizations established in 1870
Roman Catholic churches completed in 1921
Churches in Boise, Idaho
John the Evangelist (Boise, Idaho)
Churches on the National Register of Historic Places in Idaho
Churches in the Roman Catholic Diocese of Boise
Romanesque Revival church buildings in Idaho
National Register of Historic Places in Boise, Idaho
Cathedrals in Idaho
Individually listed contributing properties to historic districts on the National Register in Idaho
Tourtellotte & Hummel buildings
Works by John J. Kinsella
20th-century Roman Catholic church buildings in the United States